Kidds Store may refer to:

 Kidds Store, Kentucky
 Kidds Store, Virginia